Body Talk Pt. 1 is the fifth studio album by Swedish singer Robyn, released on 11 June 2010 by Konichiwa Records. It is the first part of the Body Talk series, which consists of three mini-albums. The only single from the album, "Dancing On My Own", was released on 1 June. Robyn promoted the album with the All Hearts Tour she co-headlined with Kelis. Body Talk Pt. 1 reached number one in Sweden and number four in Denmark and Norway. In the United States, it peaked at number three on Billboards Dance/Electronic Albums chart.

Background
Following Robyn's career relaunch and "indie" rebrand with the release of her synthpop "breakthrough" Robyn in Sweden in spring 2005, she promoted and toured the record with several subsequent editions and singles globally, taking advantage of the mid-2000s social media explosion to "amass a new 'netroots' fanbase" until the winter of late 2008. Work began on the album in July 2009 in Stockholm with Swedish producer Klas Åhlund, who also served as its executive producer. Returning to recording, Robyn revisited the records she loved and drew inspiration from including Laurie Anderson's Big Science, Prince's Dirty Mind, the Knife's Silent Shout, Janet Jackson's Control, Technotronic's Pump Up the Jam, Kate Bush's The Kick Inside, Black Box's Dreamland and work by Neneh Cherry, Dr. Alban, Gossip, DJ Mujava, Booka Shade and Gui Boratto. 

In early spring 2010, in an interview with Swedish magazine Bon, Robyn announced that she had plans to release three new albums throughout the year: "I got all these great songs so why not? [...] It's been 5 years since Robyn and I didn't want to wait with a release until they are all recorded, so I decided to start putting them out right away." Robyn told Popjustice journalist Peter Robinson, "It's been a long time since I actually made a record! And I was thinking of how to shorten that time down and Eric, my manager, came up with the idea of what if I just start releasing songs, then I can tour them, then I can make some more songs. We started working like that. I think once it starts it will make more sense – you can just keep releasing stuff without the long breaks." The release of Body Talk Pt. 1 was announced on 6 April 2010, alongside the cover art and track listing. Robyn said that "the songs that are on the first album are simply the first ones that were finished."

Lyrics and production
In an interview with Pitchfork, Robyn talked about the main lyrical theme of the album: "The whole album is about being really lonely, but I think it's interesting to put that idea in a club where a lot of people are crammed into a small room." She particularly wrote the song "Dancing On My Own" with that in mind, and continued, "I've been touring so much the last three years and spent a lot of time in clubs just watching people, and it became impossible to not use that lyric—"dancing on my own"—because it's such a beautiful picture." Robyn told Billboard that Body Talk Pt. 1 is "a record about the dancefloor", and elaborated: "It's a really important place for my generation. It's the new church. It's where people go to experience something bigger than themselves." A number of songs on the record were inspired by Robyn's "juvenile" state of mind and her outsider perspective. She said, "I'm always going to be writing about those issues, it's what I'm fascinated by but I also think there's something about the state of mind you find yourself in a lot when you're younger, and you just want to get out of somewhere. You just want to do something. Feel things!" She continued that despite her age, "I'm always going to feel like this person on the outside looking in." Another theme prevalent on the album is "technology versus humanity".

Robyn collaborated with Norwegian electronic music duo Röyksopp at their studio in Oslo on the song "None of Dem". American producer Diplo produced the song "Dancehall Queen" with Åhlund, which came together during a discussion of Ace of Base: "We were just having fun with that kind of genre music. And the idea of making this song came out of that discussion. It was fun. We really connected on something where music that you might put in one box becomes something else, depending on how you look at it." On the decision to record a dancehall inspired song despite of Robyn's nationality she said, "In my world, there are people who have already pushed those boundaries [of crossing styles] forward enough for me to feel comfortable doing a song like 'Dancehall Queen', so it's not a big deal to me." The last song on the album, "Jag vet en dejlig rosa" is a recording of a traditional Swedish folk song, famously recorded by jazz singer Monica Zetterlund. Robyn said, "I always listened to her, and she made this classic jazz album in the 60s [Waltz for Debby] with Bill Evans, which was quite a spectacular thing in Sweden at that time. 'Jag vet en dejlig rosa' was one of the songs they did, and when [producer] Klas [Åhlund] and I were in the studio, he bought exactly the same microphone that she recorded that album on. So we got all excited and decided to record the song."

Singles
Robyn stated in an interview with Swedish magazine Nöjesguiden that she would release only one official single per Body Talk album. "Fembot", "Dancehall Queen" and "None of Dem" were released to digital outlets as promotional singles on 13 April 2010. "Fembot" and "None of Dem" were initially posted on Robyn's official website in March and April 2010, while "Dancehall Queen" had previously leaked under the title "No Hassle". Due to strong sales and frequent airplay, "Fembot" reached number three on the Swedish Singles Chart and number 10 on the Norwegian Singles Chart. "Dancehall Queen" was the only other song of these three that charted, peaking at number 56 in Sweden for a single week. The official lead single, "Dancing On My Own", was released on 1 June 2010. It became Robyn's first number-one single in Sweden. It reached number three on Billboards Hot Dance Club Songs chart in the US, and became her fourth UK top-10 entry, peaking at number eight. It also charted in Denmark, Norway, Belgium (Flanders) and Germany.

Critical reception

Body Talk, Pt. 1 received generally positive reviews from most music critics. At Metacritic, which assigns a normalised rating out of 100 to reviews from mainstream critics, the album received an average score of 76, based on 23 reviews. Heather Phares of AllMusic stated, "Capturing the freedom and loneliness of independence, Body Talk, Pt. 1 is a concise set of songs on its own, and an impressive first third of the whole ambitious project." Marc Hogan of Pitchfork raved, "With Body Talk Pt. 1, [...] Robyn doesn't just walk the line between what she has called the 'commercial' and 'tastemaker' realms. She obliterates it. Immaculately produced, fantastically sung, and loaded with memorable choruses, this eight-song effort has plenty to please everyone from post-dubstep crate diggers to teen tweeters—often at the same time." The A.V. Clubs Genevieve Koski opined that it is "an album about aligning your heartbeat with the pulse of strobe lights and basslines, embracing synthetic sounds as a conduit for genuine emotion. Robyn's icy, controlled vocals and cool synth textures are almost alienating in their precision, but there's a beating pulse underneath the dance-bot artifice that captures the celebratory catharsis that can be found on the dance floor." Michael Cragg of musicOMH wrote that with Body Talk Pt. 1, Robyn is "ready to finally take her place at pop's top table of greats."

The Guardians Michael Hann commended Robyn for her "defiant independence of spirit and her versatility within the pop idiom". Spin magazine's Jessica Hopper believed that on Body Talk Pt. 1, Robyn "confidently chronicles the heartbreak ('Dancing on My Own') and pleasure ('Dancehall Queen') of epic disco nights like she's ready to rule." Will Hermes of Rolling Stone called the album "near-perfect" and concluded, "Capped with a Swedish folk gem, Body Talk shows a dancehall queen with more than just blonde ambition." Slant Magazine critic Sal Cinquemani commented that "[t]he bulk of the album is  stiff beats and in-your-face bluster that attempt to portray Robyn as more impenetrable machine than flesh-and-blood sweetheart." He added that "it also comes fully loaded with more hooks than your average pop album's entire tracklist." In a review for PopMatters, Jer Fairall expressed particular appreciation for the track "Fembot", and stated that "Body Talk, Pt. 1 shows Robyn working with the same tools that have served pop divas quite well since at least as far back as Madonna, if not earlier." However, he also noted that "[n]ot all of Body Talk, Pt. 1 works", referring to "Dancehall Queen" as "the only real bomb". Luke Lewis of NME called the album "impressive, but thin at eight tracks", while concluding, "Would it not have been better to hold back, and release just one, truly stunning record?" Matthew Horton of BBC Music felt that the album "triggers the sense Robyn's holding something back" and that it "houses so much filler", but nevertheless described "Fembot", "Dancing On My Own" and "Cry When You Get Older" as "scorchingly catchy, and laced with Robyn's familiar cordial of sparkling hook mixed with unutterable poignancy."

Track listing

Notes
  signifies a co-producer

Personnel
Credits adapted from the liner notes of Body Talk Pt. 1.

Musicians

 Robyn – vocals ; instruments, programming ; arrangement 
 Klas Åhlund – instrumentats, programming ; arrangement ; Mellotron vibraphone 
 Patrik Berger – instruments, programming 
 Diplo – instruments, programming 
 Röyksopp – instruments, programming 
 Robert Elofsson – piano 
 Simona Bonfiglioli – strings 
 Claudia Bonfiglioli – strings 
 Erik Arvinder – strings 
 Patrik Swedrup – strings 
 Marianne Herresthal – strings 
 Pelle Hansen – strings

Technical
 Klas Åhlund – production ; mixing ; executive production
 Robyn – co-production 
 Niklas Flyckt – mixing 
 Röyksopp – production 
 Tom Coyne – mastering

Artwork
 Mary Fagot – creative direction
 Lucy McRae – art direction, body architect
 Johan Renck – photography
 Sandberg&Timonen (Adamsky) – typography

Charts

Weekly charts

Year-end charts

Certifications

Release history

References

2010 albums
Albums produced by Klas Åhlund
Albums produced by Diplo
Interscope Records albums
Robyn albums